The Miss Ohio Teen USA competition is the pageant that selects the representative for the state of Ohio in the Miss Teen USA pageant and the name of the title held by that winner.

Most recently the pageant has been held in Springfield, Ohio and was previously held in Portsmouth for 14 years. Contestants compete in three competition segments: swimsuit, interview, and evening gown.  Prizes include a scholarship to Lindenwood University.

Their first Miss Teen USA title came in 2005 Allie LaForce won the national crown, Ohio's first placement since 1993. LaForce went on to become a successful sports broadcaster.

The state has won one special award, Miss Congeniality in 1997. Ohio was one of the last ten states to make their first placement. The most recent placement came in 2022, when Kylan Darnell placed in the top 16.

Only two Miss Ohio Teen USA titleholders have won the Miss Ohio USA title and competed at Miss USA. The most recent of these is Stacy Offenberger, who placed third runner-up in the Miss USA 2006 pageant.

Kylan Darnell of Wheelersburg was crowned Miss Ohio Teen USA 2022 on May 21, 2022, at Vern Riffe Center for the Arts in Portsmouth. She will represent Ohio for the title of Miss Teen USA 2022.

Results summary

Placements at Miss Teen USA
 Miss Teen USA: Allie LaForce (2005)
 4th runner-up: Kendall Fein (2012)
 Top 12: Melissa Yust (1993) 
 Top 15/16: Kelsey Stevens (2009), Olivia Turk (2016), Lily McLaughlin (2020), Kylan Darnell (2022)
Ohio holds a record of 7 placements at Miss Teen USA.

Awards at Miss Teen USA
 Miss Congeniality: Christina Todd (1997)

Winners 

1 Age at the time of the Miss Teen USA pageant

References

External links
 

Ohio
Women in Ohio